Artega may refer to:

Artega Automobile, German manufacturer of sports cars
Artega tribe, African tribe
Alfonso D'Artega (1907–1998), songwriter, conductor, arranger, and actor
Jesús Loroño Artega (1926–1998), Spanish professional road racing cyclist

See also
Ortega (disambiguation)